Brax is a commune in the Haute-Garonne department in the Occitanie region.

It is situated near the regional capital Toulouse near the Forêt de Bouconne. The village is part of the Toulouse Métropole.

Population

The inhabitants of the commune are known as Braxéens in French.

Transportation
Access to Brax is on the Route Nationale 124 or the SNCF line between Toulouse and Auch at the train station.

Sights
The ruined castle, the Château de Brax, dates back to the 13th century. During the Second World War, the resistance group Réseau Morhange of Marcel Taillandier used the castle as its headquarters.

Politics

Monuments

See also
Communes of the Haute-Garonne department

References

Communes of Haute-Garonne